The 10-second barrier is the physical and psychological barrier of completing the 100 metres sprint in under ten seconds. The achievement is traditionally regarded as the hallmark of a world-class male sprinter. Its significance has become less important since the late 1990s, as an increasing number of runners have surpassed the ten seconds mark. The current men's world record holder is Usain Bolt, who ran a 9.58 at the 2009 IAAF World Championship competition.

History

For sprints, World Athletics maintains that world records and other recognised performances require: a wind assistance of not more than two metres per second in the direction of travel; fully automatic timing (FAT) to one hundredth of a second; and no use of performance-enhancing substances. Wind gauge malfunctions or infractions may invalidate a sprinter's time.

Hand timing 

Prior to 1977, FAT was not required for IAAF official timings. Times were recorded manually to one tenth of a second; three official timers with stopwatches noted when the starting gun flashed and when the runner crossed the finish line, and their median recorded time was the official mark. Some races also had an unofficial FAT, or semi-automatic time, often in conjunction with photo finish equipment. Hayes clocked another illegal 9.9 s (wind ) in the semi-final of the 1964 Olympic 100 m, with the first sub-10 FAT of 9.91 s. In the final, Hayes' official tenths time of 10.0 s was calculated by rounding down the FAT of 10.06 s; the backup hand-timers recorded 9.8, 9.9, and 9.9, which would have given 9.9 s as the official time if the FAT had malfunctioned.
At the 1968 USA Outdoor Track and Field Championships at Charles C. Hughes Stadium in Sacramento, California, United States, three men ran legal hand-timed 9.9 seconds: Jim Hines first and Ronnie Ray Smith second in the first semi-final, and Charlie Greene first in the second semi-final. This was dubbed the "Night of Speed", and all three were recognised as world records by the IAAF. The IAAF lists their FATs as: Hines 10.03, Smith 10.14 and Greene 10.10; although Time magazine reported at the time that "an automatic Bulova Accutron Phototimer confirmed that all three had indeed broken [10.0s]". Hines also had a wind-assisted 9.8 s in the heats. Hines went on to win the 1968 Olympic 100m in 9.9 s, rounded down from his FAT of 9.95, making it the first non-wind-assisted electronic sub-10-second performance. By 1976, six other men had equalled the 9.9 s hand-timed record, though none of their performances had an FAT mark.

Automatic timing

After the 1977 rule change, Jim Hines' nine-year-old 9.95 was the only recognised sub-10-second race. That year the barrier was broken again, when Silvio Leonard ran 9.98 seconds on 11 August 1977. Both of these marks were recorded at a high altitude, which aids performance due to lower air resistance.

Carl Lewis was the first sprinter to break ten seconds at low altitude under electronic timing, with 9.97 seconds on 14 May 1983 at the Modesto Relays. Calvin Smith at altitude recorded a world record 9.93 seconds on 3 July 1983, in Colorado Springs, Colorado and became the first sprinter to run under ten seconds twice, in August that year. In total, six sprinters legally broke the barrier during the 1980s. Another, Ben Johnson, had eclipsed both the 9.90 mark and 9.80 mark in 1987, respectively 1988 with 9.83 s and 9.79 s; however, both of these records were disqualified after he tested positive for, and later admitted to, using doping, namely steroids.

The 100 m final at the 1991 World Championships represented a new zenith in the event: six athletes ran under ten seconds in the same race, and winner Carl Lewis lowered the world record to 9.86 seconds. In second place was Leroy Burrell who also broke the former world record, which had been his at 9.90 seconds. In third place, 0.01 seconds slower than the former world record, was Dennis Mitchell with a time of 9.91 seconds. In fourth place, breaking his own European record of 9.97 seconds, was Linford Christie with a time of 9.92 seconds.

Maurice Greene was the first athlete to run under 9.80 seconds in 1999. Usain Bolt surpassed 9.70 seconds in 2008 and 9.60 in 2009. The 10-second barrier has been broken by athletes from five of the six continental athletic associations, the exception being of South America where Brazilian Robson da Silva holds the area record with ten seconds flat.

The 2008 season saw a new high for sub-10 second performances: 14 runners achieved the feat a total of 53 times between them, the highest ever for either figure. Furthermore, ten men had achieved the result for the first time in that year – another record. The men's 100 metres final at the 2008 Summer Olympics saw a world record and six men clear ten seconds (equalling the number from the 1991 World Championships). Only two months into the start of the outdoor track season, 2011 became a record-breaking year as fifteen men ran under ten seconds between April and June. As of 10 June 2013, 86 sprinters have broken the 10-second barrier with an official, legal time. The men's 100 metres final at the 2012 Summer Olympics saw a new Olympic record and seven out of eight finalists running under 10 seconds. However Tyson Gay, was later disqualified from this race. Prior to his disqualification, he had been in fourth place with a time of 9.80 seconds, the fastest fourth place in history.

On 29 May 2016, former World Champion Kim Collins improved his personal record by running 9.93 +1.9 in Bottrop as a 40-year-old. He improved his own standing as the oldest man to break the 10-second barrier, the first over the age of 40. Omar McLeod, a sprint hurdles specialist, became the first hurdling athlete to break ten seconds in April 2016.

No woman has recorded an official sub-10 second time yet. The female 100-metre world record is 10.49 seconds, set by American Florence Griffith-Joyner in 1988.

Electronically timed marks

Notes
 The continental athletic association that governs the country that the athlete competes for internationally.
 The personal career best time achieved by the sprinter.
 Denotes a run achieved at a high altitude.
 Francis Obikwelu now competes for Portugal but he first broke the 10-second barrier while competing for Nigeria.
 Canadian Ben Johnson was the sixth runner to achieve the feat (having recorded multiple finishes under ten seconds), some of the runs were rescinded after Johnson admitted to using steroids between 1981 and 1988. But his 9.95 which he broke the barrier is valid and could be found on the website of world athletics.
 British sprinter Mark Lewis-Francis recorded a time of 9.97 seconds during the 2001 World Championships quarter-finals on 4 August 2001 (aged ) but the wind gauge malfunctioned, invalidating the run.
 At the Jamaican national trials in June 2011, Steve Mullings had tested positive for the drug Furosemide, a masking agent. On 22 November the Jamaican Anti-Doping Disciplinary Panel handed him a lifetime ban from athletics.
 Trayvon Bromell had broken the 10-second barrier a total of three times (9.99w, 9.77w, 9.92w) prior to recording 9.97, but all were wind-aided.
 Prior to recording his first legal sub-10 run, Andre De Grasse ran a wind-aided 9.87 on 18 April 2015.
 Jak Ali Harvey was born in Jamaica.
 Ramil Guliyev was born in Azerbaijan.

Totals

Hand timed marks
The following sprinters all received a hand-timed mark of 9.9 seconds. All the runners held the world record simultaneously. However, the timing may not have been precise. (Note that Bob Hayes clocked a hand timed 9.9 seconds in the 1964 Olympic final, but his FAT 10.06 s was the official time, and it was given as “10.0” s.)

References

General
100 Metres All Time. IAAF (2009-06-02). Retrieved on 3 June 2009.

Specific

External links
"How much faster can humans run?" article from The Independent

100 metres
Sport of athletics records